Jay R. Kaufman, is the founding President of Beacon Leadership Collaborative.  Between 1994 and 2019 he served as the State Representative in the Massachusetts House of Representatives, retiring after 24 years in January 2019.  
Massachusetts' 15th Middlesex District (Lexington, and Wards 1 and 7 of Woburn, all in Middlesex County).

Education
Kaufman attended Brandeis University where he received a BA. and a MA., and New York University, where he received an MA.

Profession
Founder and President, Beacon Leadership Collaborative

Organizations
Environmental Business Council; Smaller Business Association of New England; Mass. Water Supply Citizens Advisory Committee.

Public office
State Representative, Massachusetts House of Representatives (1995-2019); Lexington Town Meeting Member (1989–2019); Massachusetts Bays Program (Founder and CAC Chair); Mass. Board of Underwater Archaeological Resources; Mass. House (1995–2019).

References

External links
Official Bio
beaconleadershipcollaborative.org 

1947 births
Members of the Massachusetts House of Representatives
Brandeis University alumni
New York University alumni
People from Lexington, Massachusetts
Living people
21st-century American politicians